Notable people named Matthew Blair include:

Matt Blair (1950–2020), American football player
Matty Blair (born 1989), English footballer